Eucalyptus johnstonii, commonly known as Tasmanian yellow gum, is a species of medium-sized to tall tree endemic to Tasmania. It has smooth yellow to greenish bark, lance-shaped adult leaves, flower buds in groups of three, white flowers and hemispherical or bell-shaped fruit.

Description
It has smooth yellow to brownish or greenish bark, sometimes with persistent fibrous bark near the base. Young plants and coppice regrowth have stems that are more or less square in cross-section with a broad wing on each corner and sessile. Flowering mainly occurs from February to April and the flowers are white.

Taxonomy and naming
Eucalyptus johnstonii was first formally described in 1922 by Joseph Maiden and the description was published in Volume 6 of his book, A Critical Revision of the Genus Eucalyptus. The specific epithet honours Robert Mackenzie Johnston.

Maiden noted that the species had already been described in 1886 by Thomas Bather Moore. Moore gave it the name Eucalyptus muelleri, a name that was already used for a different species, making it an illegitimate name. Maiden gave a further description and a diagram of the same species in Volume 3 of his book.

Distribution and habitat
Tasmanian yellow gum grows in tall forest on mountains and plateaus in south-eastern Tasmania including on Mount Wellington, Bruny Island and the Tasman Peninsula.

See also

List of Eucalyptus species

References

Trees of Australia
johnstonii
Endemic flora of Tasmania
Plants described in 1922
Taxa named by Joseph Maiden